Bodrišna Vas is a settlement in the Municipality of Šmarje pri Jelšah in eastern Slovenia. It lies in the hills north of Šentvid pri Grobelnem in the historical region of Styria. The municipality is now included in the Savinja Statistical Region.

References

External links
Bodrišna Vas at Geopedia

Populated places in the Municipality of Šmarje pri Jelšah